Barikane may refer to several places in Mali:

Banikane, Gourma-Rharous, village and commune
Banikane Narhawa, commune